Kalogreza station was a station of the Piraeus, Athens and Peloponnese Railways (SPAP) in Kalogreza in Nea Ionia, Athens, Greece next to the boundary with Maroussi, and was also the northernmost station. The station was constructed for the use of lignite production and its trucks from Kalogreza. The station opened after 1944 and closed in 1957.

Railway stations in Athens
Railway stations in Attica
Railway stations closed in 1957
1957 disestablishments in Greece
Transport in North Athens
Piraeus, Athens and Peloponnese Railways
Buildings and structures in North Athens